Freestyle skydiving is a competitive skydiving discipline where one member of a two-person team performs acrobatic manoeuvres in free fall while the other one films the performance from a close distance using a helmet-mounted camera.

History
The first ever international skydiving competition was held in 1990 and was directed by World Freestyle Federation. In 1995 the sport gained much popularity across the world and had 62 teams from over 24 countries participating in this competition. This soon made way for World Cup of Skydiving in 1996. Freestyle was first performed by Deanna Kent and others for her husband Norman Kent's 1989 film "From Wings Came Flight". It became a competitive skydiving discipline in the early 1990s and became an official FAI sport in 1996.

Indoor freestyle skydiving

Indoor freestyle skydiving, also known as skydancing, is another form of the sport, made possible since the development of vertical wind tunnels in 1964.

Amy Watson was entered into the Guinness Book of World Records at age 11 by completing 44 360-degree horizontal spins in one minute.

Indoor freestyle skydiving is typically set to music. At the Wind Games 2016, international competitors Leonid Volkov (Russian) took gold, Maja Kuczyńska (Poland) took Silver and Guillaume Boileau (Canadian) took bronze. Although the movements appear fluid and effortless, they require great strength and control. The competitions consist of low and high speed flow which means competitors can execute very different moves in the wind flow. The routines include gymnastic moves, balletic type Ts, somersaults, twists and splits.

Competitions 
A number of competitions based on indoor skydiving have emerged, such as the FAI World Cup of Indoor Skydiving since 2015 and the Windoor Wind Games since 2014. There are also efforts underway to bring Bodyflying to the Olympics.

See also
 Bodyflight
 Freeflying
 Skydiving
 Parachute
 Drop zone

References

External links
Artistic Events - FAI international parachuting commission (Freestyle Skydiving, Sky surfing & Free flying)
Freestyle Skydiving - winddance.com

Acrobatic sports
Parachuting